The Šušvė Landscape Sanctuary is a protected area of a state importance in Josvainiai Eldership, Kėdainiai District Municipality, in central Lithuania. It covers the lower course of the Šušvė river between Macgaliai village and the Šušvė confluence with the Nevėžis river. It also include the lower courses of the Šušvė tributaries the Žiedupė, the Vikšrupis and the Putnupys.

The aim of the sanctuary is to protect the Šušvė river valley with outcrops and vimba spawning grounds. The valley is of  width,  depth, slopes and terraces are covered by bushes and leafy groves. The river course is loopy, there are oxbow lakes. The river flow is rapid, deeply burrows into the earth. There are outcrops of Devonic sand, clay and gypsum. Suphosic circuses could be observed on the river slopes.

There are rare plant species, growing on the riparian meadows, such as star gentian, Conioselinum tataricum, Campanula bononiensis, Orchis militaris. Common kingfishers nest on the scarps, and Eurasian otters live in the river water.

References

Protected areas in Kėdainiai District Municipality
1974 establishments in Lithuania